Aleksei Vladimirovich Goncharov (born 16 August 1988) is a Russian former professional football player.

Club career
He played in the Russian Football National League for FC Dynamo Barnaul in 2008.

External links
 Career summary by Sportbox
 

1988 births
Living people
Russian footballers
Association football midfielders
FC Zenit Saint Petersburg players
FC Dynamo Barnaul players
FC Chita players